The 1975–76 NBA season was the Lakers' 28th season in the NBA and 16th season in Los Angeles.

On June 16, 1975, the Lakers had traded Elmore Smith, Brian Winters, David Meyers, and Junior Bridgeman to the Milwaukee Bucks, in exchange for Kareem Abdul-Jabbar. The Lakers raced to a 21-13 start before slumping back to .500 and failing to make the playoffs. Despite the Lakers' losing regular-season record (40–42), Abdul-Jabbar won MVP honors in a narrow vote over Bob McAdoo of the Buffalo Braves and Dave Cowens of the Boston Celtics.

Roster

Regular season

Season standings

z – clinched division title
y – clinched division title
x – clinched playoff spot

Record vs. opponents

Awards and records
 Kareem Abdul-Jabbar, NBA Most Valuable Player Award
 Kareem Abdul-Jabbar, All-NBA First Team
 Kareem Abdul-Jabbar, NBA All-Defensive Second Team
 Kareem Abdul-Jabbar, NBA All-Star Game

References

Los Angeles Lakers seasons
Los Angeles Lakers
Los Angle
Los Angle